Wheatland is a town in and the county seat of Platte County in southeastern Wyoming, United States. The population was 3,627 at the 2010 census.

History

Before the late 19th century, the area around the future site of Wheatland was a flat, arid landscape with desert-like vegetation. In 1883 local rancher and judge Joseph M. Carey, along with Horace Plunkett, John Hoyt, Morton Post, Francis E. Warren, William Irvine, and Andrew Gilchrist, established the Wyoming Development Company. The company hoped to irrigate in the Wheatland Flats and profit from new development.

By the fall of 1883 an irrigation system was constructed on the Wheatland flats including a 2,380 foot long tunnel to divert water for irrigation into Bluegrass Creek and the first two of the system's canals. The Cheyenne and Northern Railway line reached the Wheatland flats in July, 1887, eventually extending to the Wyoming Central Railway at Wendover. The line was eventually sold to the Colorado and Southern Railway, controlled by the Chicago, Burlington, and Quincy Railroad, and operated at Wheatland station. Lots in the town of Wheatland were auctioned in 1894. By 1915 many farms were established in the irrigation district and the population of the flats was 5,277.

In 1911 Platte County was created from a portion of Albany County, and Wheatland was selected as the county seat. The Platte County Courthouse was built in Wheatland in 1917.

The Wheatland Irrigation District is still the largest privately owned irrigation system in the country.

Geography

Wheatland is located at  (42.053917, –104.959460).

Demographics

2010 census
As of the census of 2010, there were 3,627 people, 1,657 households, and 974 families living in the town. The racial makeup of the town was 95.1% White, 0.1% African American, 0.4% Native American, 0.7% Asian, 2.1% from other races, and 1.6% from two or more races. Hispanic or Latino of any race were 7.4% of the population.

There were 1,657 households, of which 25.0% had children under the age of 18 living with them, 46.0% were married couples living together, 8.8% had a female householder with no husband present, 3.9% had a male householder with no wife present, and 41.2% were non-families. 37.5% of all households were made up of individuals, and 19.3% had someone living alone who was 65 years of age or older. The average household size was 2.13 and the average family size was 2.78.

The median age in the town was 45.4 years. 20.7% of residents were under the age of 18; 7.1% were between the ages of 18 and 24; 21.6% were from 25 to 44; 28.3% were from 45 to 64; and 22.3% were 65 years of age or older. The gender makeup of the town was 48.7% male and 51.3% female.

2000 census

As of the census of 2000, there were 3,548 people, 1,539 households, and 980 families living in the town. The population density was 837.6 people per square mile (323.1/km2). There were 1,764 housing units at an average density of 416.4 per square mile (160.6/km2). The racial makeup of the town was 96.00% White, 0.31% African American, 0.68% Native American, 0.34% Asian, 1.89% from other races, and 0.79% from two or more races. Hispanic or Latino of any race were 6.54% of the population.

There were 1,539 households, out of which 27.0% had children under the age of 18 living with them, 52.7% were married couples living together, 7.9% had a female householder with no husband present, and 36.3% were non-families. 32.2% of all households were made up of individuals, and 16.8% had someone living alone who was 65 years of age or older. The average household size was 2.24 and the average family size was 2.83.

In the town, the population was spread out, with 22.8% under the age of 18, 7.2% from 18 to 24, 22.7% from 25 to 44, 26.5% from 45 to 64, and 20.8% who were 65 years of age or older. The median age was 43 years. For every 100 females, there were 89.5 males. For every 100 females age 18 and over, there were 88.8 males.

The median income for a household in the town was $35,208, and the median income for a family was $42,623. Males had a median income of $34,940 versus $20,185 for females. The per capita income for the town was $19,069. About 6.9% of families and 8.9% of the population were below the poverty line, including 9.9% of those under age 18 and 8.6% of those age 65 or over.

Political affiliation 
Wheatland is a community which supports the Republican Party by reliable margins. In the 2020 United States presidential election, the city voted for GOP incumbent Donald Trump over Democratic nominee Joe Biden, varying from 49 percentage points in favor of Trump in the inner regions of Wheatland to 75 percentage points in the outskirts. The inner regions, however, proportionally voted in favor of Biden and the Democrats more so than they did in 2016, when Hillary Clinton was the nominee for the party in that year's presidential election.

Climate
Wheatland experiences a semi-arid climate (Köppen BSk) with cold, dry winters and hot, wetter summers.

Education
Public education in the town of Wheatland is provided by Platte County School District #1. Campuses serving the town include Libbey Elementary School (grades K–2), West Elementary School (grades 3–5), Wheatland Middle School (grades 6–8), and Wheatland High School (grades 9–12).

Wheatland has a public library, a branch of the Platte County Public Library System.

Transport

Highways 
 - north-south route through Wheatland.

Air Transport 
Wheatland is served by Phifer Airfield just east of town on State Route 316 (Gilchrist St./Antelope Gap Rd.). However, the field has no direct commercial service, residents can choose between Western Nebraska Regional Airport, Casper–Natrona County International Airport, and Cheyenne Regional Airport.

Railroads 
Wheatland is the home of the historical Wheatland station, then operated by Union Pacific, Denver and Gulf Railway. The station is not open today for revenue service, though the tracks through Wheatland are currently owned and used by Berkshire Hathaway's BNSF Railway after a series of acquisitions which gave BNSF the Wheatland assets formerly operated by Union Pacific, Denver and Gulf. BNSF currently has small offices located in Wheatland.

Arts and culture
Wheatland hosts the annual Platte County Fair & Rodeo, usually held the second full week of August, at the fairgrounds on the east edge of town at Front Street and Antelope Gap Road.

The horse Steamboat, the model for the bucking horse and rider motif on the Wyoming license, was stabled near Wheatland in a barn owned and maintained as a historical structure by Mike and Linda Holst. Steamboat is also the logo for the University of Wyoming.

Notable people 

 Benjamin N. Bellis (1924–2019), United States Air Force Lieutenant General
 Freckles Brown (1921–1987), Professional Rodeo Cowboys Association world champion bull rider
 Edward Bryant (1945–2017), science fiction writer, fantasy author
 Jim Geringer (born 1944), former governor of Wyoming
 Robert Mills Grant (1926–2012), rancher and Republican member of the Wyoming House of Representatives from 1983 to 1992 
Jeremy Haroldson, pastor, member of the Wyoming House of Representatives
 Floyd Shaman (1935–2005), sculptor
 Dennis Utter (1939–2011), Nebraska state legislator

References

External links
 Platte County Record Times
 Wheaterville News

Towns in Platte County, Wyoming
Towns in Wyoming
County seats in Wyoming